The Battle of Vyazma (November 3, 1812), occurred at the beginning of Napoleon's retreat from Moscow. In this encounter a Russian force commanded by General Miloradovich inflicted heavy losses on the rear guard of the Grande Armee. Although the French thwarted Miloradovich's goal of encircling and destroying the corps of Marshal Davout, they withdrew in a partial state of disorder due to ongoing Russian harassment and heavy artillery bombardments. The French reversal at Vyazma, although indecisive, was significant due its damaging impact on several corps of Napoleon's retreating army.

Background
It was choked by partisan activity and Cossack raiding parties. French supply trains were routinely wiped out and 15,000 French troops were captured along this road in September and October alone. The French departed Moscow on 18 October, and after having a southern route to Smolensk denied them as a result of the Battle of Maloyaroslavets (24 October), they were compelled to backtrack and retreat along the same road used in their earlier advance on Moscow. Because the territory alongside this road had been economically ravaged by earlier French campaigning, the retreat imposed on the Grande Armée extreme conditions of privation and attrition. Lack of foodstuffs soon led to demoralization, disorder and even starvation in the French ranks.

The head of the column, Junot's VIII Corps, was at Dorogobuzh, with Davout's I Corps, serving as the army's rearguard, located at the tail of the army just east of Vyazma. Between these two endpoints were, running west to east, the Imperial Guard, Joachim Murat's troops, Michel Ney's III Corps, Poniatowski's V Corps, and Eugène's IV Corps.

At this point, the French retreat was harassed by Cossack attacks at every juncture, Davout's corps in particular being beleaguered by Russian attacks.  By 2 November, Napoleon had grown dissatisfied with Davout's management of rearguard activities, and ordered Ney to remain in Vyazma, to allow the I, IV, and V Corps to bypass him, and to assume rearguard duties himself.

The Russians, meanwhile, organized themselves into three groups while pursuing the French. First, following Davout closely were 5,000 Cossacks commanded by Ataman Platov. This group was supported by General Ivan Paskevich's 26th Division, with 4,000 troops. Marching slightly to the south was General Miloradovich with the II and IV Infantry Corps, some 14,000 troops in all, and the II and III Cavalry Corps, which amounted to 3,500 soldiers. Miloradovich coordinated the activity of all of these troops, including those of Platov and Paskevich. The main Russian army led by Mikhail Kutuzov, some 70,000 troops in all, marched further to the south.

On the evening of 2 November, while conducting reconnaissance south of the Smolensk-Moscow road, Miloradovich, together with his cavalry commanders General Korff and General Sievers, noticed a gap between the I Corps, situated to the east at Fedorovskoye, and the troops of the IV and V Corps located to the west just outside Vyazma. Recognizing an opportunity to isolate and destroy Davout's corps, the aggressive Miloradovich decided to attack early the next morning.

Action

Russian cavalry attacks
At 8 am on 3 November, Miloradovich's cavalry attacked the disorganized French column holding the length of road which separated the I Corps from the IV and V Corps. Miloradovich also ordered his artillery, positioned on nearby heights, to begin a cannonade. With beautiful warm weather with bright sunshine the attack was a complete success, as it captured the French IV Corps baggage train and sent the French troops fleeing in disarray. Miloradovich then placed infantrymen and horse batteries astraddle the road, thereby severing Davout's connection with the rest of the French army.

Simultaneous to Miloradovich's attack to the west of Davout, Platov's Cossacks attacked Davout from the east, supported by Paskevich's troops. Davout's infantrymen formed squares to meet the attack from Platov and Paskevich, and his artillerymen set up their pieces to return Miloradovich's fire. The 14,000 exhausted, hunger-weakened soldiers of Davout's Corps were now at risk of being overwhelmed and destroyed by the Russians.

Eugene's counterattack
Fortunately for Davout, there was a weakness in the Russian plan of attack, in that the Russian cavalry had attacked the Vyazma-Fedorovskoye road that morning without the full support of the II and IV Infantry Corps (led by Eugene of Württemberg and General Ostermann-Tolstoy respectively), which were located to the south and would not be able to reach the battlefield until 10 am, two hours after the action commenced. Miloradovich, fearing that the gap between Davout and the rest of the French army would close before he could exploit it, felt it expedient to launch his cavalry attack without having the balance of his infantry on hand. Lacking sufficient numbers of infantrymen to consolidate their hold on the Vyazma-Fedorovskoye road, Miloradovich's cavalry was vulnerable to a determined French counterattack.

At this juncture, Davout's fortunes changed for the better. His infantrymen to the east repulsed Platov and Paskevich with steady, disciplined musketfire. More importantly, Eugene heard the cannon fire engulfing Davout's position to the rear, and immediately ordered his troops to counterattack Miloradovich and regain possession of the Vyazma-Fedorovskoye road.

Eugene's counterattack fell on the rear of the troops Miloradovich had positioned on the road facing Davout. This counterattack was conducted by two of Eugene's Italian divisions, one division of Poles from the V Corps, and a single regiment of troops sent to the scene by Ney, whose III Corps was positioned in the heights near Vyazma. Davout, upon seeing these troops advancing to rescue him, sent his infantrymen to attack as well.  Miloradovich's cavalry and his small body of infantrymen were now attacked from the east and the west, including being enveloped in French artillery shot, and were compelled to retreat from the road. Thanks to Eugene's counterattack, a passageway had been created on the Vyazma-Fedorovskoye road for Davout to continue his retreat.

Miloradovich repositions his troops
The Russians at this point had been repulsed at all points, but they were hardly finished with the battle. Having pulled back from Eugene's attack, Miloradovich ordered his troops to reposition themselves parallel to the road. A heavy cannonade was then commenced against Davout's troops as they retreated toward Vyazma.  Davout's artillery was unable to respond effectively to the Russian fire, and panic broke out among his troops.

Louis Philippe, comte de Ségur, an observer of the action on the French side, describes this moment in the battle thus:

…disorder reigned in the I Corps – the one commanded by Davout. The sudden maneuver, the surprise, and particularly the tragic example of the crowd of unhorsed, unarmed cavalrymen running up and down in blind fright, threw this corps into utter confusion. This spectacle encouraged the enemy, who credited themselves with a victory. Their artillery, superior in strength, galloped into position and, opening an oblique fire on our lines, began mowing our men down, while our own guns were coming back to us at a snail's pace from Vyazma.

The damage wrought by the Russian artillery on Davout's troops was such that many of them were compelled to abandon the road, and to retreat across an open field in their desperation to reach safety behind Eugene's position. By 10 am, when the rest of Miloradovich's infantry arrived, Davout's battered corps had taken shelter behind Eugene.

Eugene's troops, too, came under pressure from the Russians and were obliged to fall back.  General Sir Robert Wilson, an Englishman who observed the action from the Russian side, describes the combat at this moment as follows:

On the remainder of the Russian infantry coming up (Eugene of Württemberg and Ostermann-Tolstoy), Miloradovich renewed the attack under protection of a superior and admirably served artillery. The enemy fell back on a second position, between Rjavets and the farm of Rieaupiere, and thence, when menaced on both flanks, to some heights in front of Vyazma, where they were reinforced by the two Italian divisions, the Italian guards, and the corps of Ney.

According to Segur, the Russian cannonshot and musketry at this point were "frighteningly effective."

At 2:00 pm, Davout, Eugene, and Poniatowski/Zajączek conferred, and they concluded that victory was not possible given the disorganization in the French units caused by the Russian aggression. Soon, the three French corps had retreated into Vyazma.

At some point prior to the three French corps falling back to a position on the heights protected by Ney, Miloradovich urgently requested reinforcements from Kutusov, as he recognized that the French were vulnerable and the opportunity for a great victory may have presented itself.

Final Russian assault on Vyazma
At 4 pm, the fighting spread into the town of Vyazma itself, which at this point was consumed by flames. By now the infantry of General Choglokov (from Ostermann-Tolstoy's corps), as well as detachments of Platov's Cossacks were engaging the French in torrid, close quarters combat on the streets of Vyazma.  The French were hard pressed, and had to fight desperately to hold the Russians off while evacuating the town.

By 8 pm, the fighting was over. The corps of Davout, Eugene, and Poniatowski/Zajączek had retreated west of Vyazma, bruised but safe. Ney's rearguard was last to withdraw from the town, suffering heavy losses in a final bayonet fight with a force of Russian grenadiers.

In order to cover their retreat, the French had set large sections of Vyazma on fire, resulting in many wounded from both sides burning to death. Worse yet, the French are reported to have locked civilians and Russian prisoners in buildings before setting them aflame. Russian troops pouring into the town were able to save some of these victims.

That evening, Ney's corps remained on the western outskirts of Vyazma to block the Russians. However, given the Russians' aggression, great danger remained, and according to Caulaincourt, even Ney had to "continue his retreating movement before dawn in order not to risk the loss of his troops."

The next day, withdrawing along a road heaped for miles with burning, overturned wagons, and blown-up ammunition caches, Ney dispatched an entire series of grim reports to Napoleon detailing the lost battle.

Consequences

The Battle of Vyazma represented a defeat of the Grande Armée's rearguard, as French losses in this battle, 6,000 to 8,000 casualties, including 4,000 lost as prisoners to the Russians, were prohibitive. The shock of the Russian attack reduced many French units to a state of disarray, and owing to the speed with which their retreat had to be resumed, order was never restored within them. These disorganized units became easy targets for Cossack raids in the following days.

General Armand de Caulaincourt, the famed memoirist who participated in the events of 1812 from the French side, perhaps best summarized the effects of Vyazma on his army with the following rueful words:

Until then – as long, that is, as it had to withstand alone the attacks of the enemy – the First Corps had maintained its honor and reputation, although it was fiercely attacked and its formation broken by the artillery. This momentary disorder was conspicuous because it was the first time that these gallant infantry broke ranks and compelled their dogged commander to give ground. I have related these painful details because from this incident must be dated our disorganization and misfortunes. The First Corps, which on taking the field was the largest and finest, a rival to the Guard, was thenceforward the hardest hit; and the evil spread.

Russian casualties at Vyazma were no more than 1,800 killed and wounded, out of 26,500 troops involved.

But Napoleon reached Smolensk thus saving the remnants of his troops for the subsequent Battle of Krasnoi.

Popular culture
Leo Tolstoy references the battle in his War and Peace.

See also
List of battles of the French invasion of Russia

Notes

Citations

References
 Napoleon's Russian Campaign of 1812, Edward Foord, Boston, Little Brown and Company, 
 Russia Against Napoleon, Dominic Lieven, Penguin Books, 
Napoleon In Russia: A Concise History of 1812, 2004, Digby Smith, Pen & Sword Military, 
The War of the Two Emperors, Curtis Cate, Random House, New York, 
The Greenhill Napoleonic Wars Data Source, 1998, Digby Smith, Greenhill Books, 
1812 Napoleon's Russian Campaign, Richard K. Riehn, John Wiley & Sons, Inc., 
With Napoleon In Russia, Armand de Caulaincourt, William Morrow & Co., 
Narrative of Events during the Invasion of Russia by Napoleon Bonaparte, and the Retreat of the French Army, 1812, Sir Robert Wilson, Elibron Classics, 
Napoleon's Russian Campaign, Philippe-Paul de Segur, Greenwood Press, 
Military History and Atlas of the Napoleonic Wars, Vincent J. Esposito and John R. Elting, Greenhill Books, 
Moscow 1812: Napoleon's Fatal March, Adam Zamoyski, Harper Collins, 
The Campaigns of Napoleon, David Chandler, The MacMillan Company,

External links
Napoleon's Invasion of Russia 1812
Map of Battle of Vyazma 1812

Battles of the French invasion of Russia
Battles of the Napoleonic Wars
Battles involving Russia
Battles involving France
Battles involving Poland
Conflicts in 1812
November 1812 events
1812 in the Russian Empire
History of Smolensk Oblast